is a town located in Izumi District, Kagoshima Prefecture, Japan.

Demography 
On March 20, 2006 the town of Azuma, from Izumi District, was merged into Nagashima.

As of April 2017, the town has an estimated population of 10,124 and a density of 87 persons per km². The total area is 116.13 km².

Geography 
Nagashima Island, comprising the majority of city area, is located just south of Amakusa and connected to mainland Kyūshū via the  bridge. It is primarily a farming and fishing community.

Economy 
Nagashima's chief exports are sweet potatoes, shōchū, and yellowtail. Some of Kagoshima's most well known shōchū is distilled in Nagashima. Such brands include Shimabijin (Beautiful Islander), Shimaotome (Island maiden), Shimamusume (Island Daughter), and DanDan ("thank you" in Kagoshima dialect).

Attractions 
 Gyōnindake (traveler's mountain) has view of Amakusa and some of the smaller islands around Nagashima. 
 Hotel Nagashima has an Onsen center as well as fine dining.
 A Jōmon era tomb which celebrates an annual festival

Transportation 
Nagashima is accessible by car via the Kuronoseto bridge from Izumi District, or by ferry from Amakusa or Kumamoto.

See also
Nagashima Island, Kagoshima

References

External links

Nagashima official website 

Towns in Kagoshima Prefecture